glow is a Canadian beauty and health magazine founded in 2002 and published eight times a year.

glow also has two sister magazines glow health and teen glow as well as a French version pure.

glow was shuttered in March 2017.

History and profile
glow was founded in 2002. The magazine was part of Shoppers Drug Mart. It was published by Rogers Communications in Toronto from its start to 2011. St. Joseph Communications re-launched the magazine as a publisher with the May 2012 issue as "Canada's Beauty Expert". The magazine featured super model Daria Werbowy on the cover and showcased a new design and direction lead by creative director Daniel MacKinnon. The magazine was published eight times a year along with a French version Pure. It focused on beauty, fashion and health along with celebrity profiles.

In May 2017, glow shut down its print and digital editions.

References

External links
 Official website

Defunct magazines published in Canada
Fashion magazines published in Canada
Eight times annually magazines
Magazines established in 2002
Magazines disestablished in 2017
Magazines published in Toronto
Women's fashion magazines
Women's magazines published in Canada